Nympha may refer to:
 another term for a chrysalis
 the labia minora (often in plural, nymphae)
 Nympha (Ninfa), a 5th-century virgin Christian martyr from Palermo